The South Central Counties Cup is a domestic women's one-day cricket competition in England. Organised by the Southern Vipers regional team for the six counties that make up the team's region in the South of England, its first edition took place in 2022. Berkshire, Buckinghamshire, Dorset, Hampshire, Oxfordshire and Sussex are the six teams that take part in the competition.

Following the end of the Women's County Championship in 2019 and the launching of the new regional structure for domestic women's cricket in England in 2020, county sides were left without any 50-over cricket. Following the launch of similar competitions such as the East of England Women's County Championship and the Women's London Championship, the South Central Counties Cup therefore aims to provide "meaningful" 50-over cricket to the county teams in the region.

The inaugural 2022 edition of the competition took place from 30 May to 11 August, with each team playing each other once. Hampshire were the inaugural winners of the competition, winning four of their five matches (with the other abandoned).

References

Women's cricket competitions in England
English domestic cricket competitions
Southern Vipers
Cricket in Berkshire
Cricket in Buckinghamshire
Cricket in Dorset
Cricket in Hampshire
Cricket in Sussex
Cricket in Oxfordshire
2022 establishments in England
Recurring sporting events established in 2022